Holt Arena is an indoor multi-purpose athletic stadium in the western United States, located on the campus of Idaho State University (ISU) in Pocatello, Idaho.

History
Originally named the ASISU Minidome—named after the Associated Students of Idaho State University, who funded construction—it opened  in 1970 at the north end of the ISU campus. The indoor facility replaced the outdoor "Spud Bowl" as the Bengals' home football stadium.

The venue was renamed in 1988 to honor Milton W. "Dubby" Holt (1914–2007), ISU's athletic director from 1967 to 1989. As assistant athletic director, Holt conceived the indoor arena in 1966 and it was designed by architect Cedric M. Allen. Although a controversial design proposal for the time, ISU students voted to appropriate not more than $2.8 million to the project two years later. The arena was built entirely with these voluntary student funds. With over 56% in favor, ISU students approved a $12 increase in semester fees to fund the stadium in early 1968.

Holt Arena is the oldest enclosed stadium on a college campus in the United States and the second-oldest overall. Only the Astrodome in Houston, completed in 1965, predates it. Since the Astrodome's 2006 closure, Holt Arena has been the oldest enclosed stadium in use. The football field is aligned east-west and the arched roof runs length-wise; maximum height is above midfield and decreases toward the endzones.

The original artificial turf installed in 1970 was Poly-Turf. After 41 football seasons on Poly-Turf and AstroTurf, infilled synthetic turf was installed in Holt Arena in July 2011. Similar to FieldTurf, the SoftTop Removable Matrix System is also installed in AT&T Stadium in the NFL.

Holt Arena is undergoing major renovations which are planned to be complete by the 2023 season. A new turf is being designed as part of the renovations, and the new turf is projected to be installed by the 2022 season.

Additional uses
Holt Arena also serves as home for the ISU indoor track and field team and men's basketball team. It also hosts high school football games, the famous Simplot Games high school indoor track meet, along with other sporting events, rodeos, concerts, and other activities.

During ISU's run in basketball to the Elite Eight in 1977, they won the Big Sky regular season title, which allowed them to host the four-team conference tournament, which they also won. The Bengals were allowed to stay home for the first round of the 32-team NCAA tournament, as the Minidome had a pair of first round games (sub-regionals) on Saturday, March 12. UCLA defeated Louisville and hometown ISU beat Long Beach State. (Five days later, Idaho State stunned UCLA in the Sweet Sixteen at the West regional in Provo, Utah.) Between the Big Sky tourney and the NCAA games, the venue also hosted the state's three-day A-1 (now 5A) high school championship tournament.

Following the success of the Minidome, several other colleges built enclosed stadiums, including the Kibbie Dome at the University of Idaho in Moscow, which was enclosed in 1975 after four years as an outdoor stadium, and the Walkup Skydome at Northern Arizona University in Flagstaff, opened in 1977.

It is one of three indoor football stadiums currently in use in the Big Sky Conference, along with the Kibbie Dome and Walkup Skydome. During the final six seasons of Idaho's absence from Big Sky football (2012–2017), the Alerus Center at the University of North Dakota in Grand Forks was another indoor stadium used in Big Sky football, but UND left the Big Sky after the 2017 football season for the Missouri Valley Football Conference, home to three other football programs that play in domes (North Dakota State, Northern Iowa, and South Dakota).

Holt Arena hosted the 2018 convention of the Idaho Republican Party in late June.

See also
 
 
 List of NCAA Division I FCS football stadiums
 List of NCAA Division I basketball arenas

References

External links 
 ISU Bengals Athletics - Holt Arena
 Idaho State University - Office of Events: Holt Arena
 Idaho Public Television - Holt Arena
 World Stadiums - Holt Arena
 Simplot Games - annual indoor track meet at Holt Arena

College basketball venues in the United States
College football venues
American football venues in Idaho
Idaho State Bengals football
Idaho State Bengals men's basketball
Basketball venues in Idaho
Covered stadiums in the United States
Buildings and structures in Bannock County, Idaho
Tourist attractions in Bannock County, Idaho
Sports venues completed in 1970
1970 establishments in Idaho